Amanda Township is one of the twelve townships of Allen County, Ohio, United States. As of the 2010 census the population was 2,071.

Geography
Located in the western part of the county, it borders the following townships:
Marion Township – north
American Township – northeast
Shawnee Township – southeast
Logan Township, Auglaize County – south
Spencer Township – west

No municipalities are located in Amanda Township.

Name and history
Statewide, other Amanda Townships are located in Fairfield and Hancock counties.

Government
The township is governed by a three-member board of trustees, who are elected in November of odd-numbered years to a four-year term beginning on the following January 1. Two are elected in the year after the presidential election and one is elected in the year before it. There is also an elected township fiscal officer, who serves a four-year term beginning on April 1 of the year after the election, which is held in November of the year before the presidential election. Vacancies in the fiscal officership or on the board of trustees are filled by the remaining trustees.

References

External links
Allen County website

Townships in Allen County, Ohio
Townships in Ohio